The second election to the Greater London Council was held on 13 April 1967, and saw the first Conservative victory for a London-wide authority since 1931.

Electoral arrangements
New constituencies to be used for elections to Parliament and also for elections to the GLC had not yet been settled, so the London boroughs were used as multi-member 'first past the post' electoral areas. Westminster was joined with the City of London for this purpose. Each electoral area returned between 2 and 4 councillors.

Results
In addition to the 100 councillors, there were sixteen Aldermen who divided 10 Conservative and 6 Labour, so that the Conservatives actually had 92 seats to 24 for Labour following the election.

With an electorate of 5,319,023, there was a turnout of 41.1%.

Among those defeated in the election were the Labour leader, Bill Fiske in Havering by a Conservative team that included Jeffrey Archer, who was making his entrance into politics. Other notable politicians who had their first success at this election include Harvey Hinds (Labour, Southwark, later Chief Whip for Ken Livingstone) and Christopher Bland (Conservative, Lewisham, later Chairman of the BBC).

By-elections 1967-1970
One of the successful Conservative candidates, Sheila Bradley (Greenwich), was a school nurse for the Inner London Education Authority. It was discovered that this was a disqualifying office, as she was in effect an employee of the GLC (as ILEA was technically a committee of the GLC); she resigned on 24 May prior to the hearing of an election petition. At a by-election on 29 June, Labour gained the seat. There were two further by-elections during the term: on 7 November 1968 the Conservatives held a seat in Bromley after the death of a councillor, and on 12 December of the same year the Conservatives held a seat in Havering after one of their councillors resigned.

There were two seats vacant by the end of the term. A Conservative councillor for Harrow died on 8 June 1969, and on 8 January 1970 a Conservative councillor for Hammersmith was disqualified after failing to attend a meeting of the GLC or its committees for six months.

References

1967 elections in the United Kingdom
1967 in London
1967
April 1967 events in the United Kingdom